Honda Racing Corporation (HRC) is a racing division of the Honda Motor Company formed in 1982. From its founding, the company was initially solely responsible for Honda's motorcycle racing activities, before the brand's automobile racing activities were integrated into HRC's scope of work on 1 April 2022. The company combines participation in motorcycle races throughout the world with the development of racing machines. Its racing activities are an important source for the creation of technologies used in the development of Honda motorcycles. HRC activities include sales of production racing motorcycles, support for satellite teams, and rider education programs.

In February 2023, the FIA confirmed that Honda, through HRC, is provisionally listed as a power unit manufacturer for 2026.

History
Initially, Honda's racing efforts were run from within the company. In the early 1970s, the Racing Service Center (RSC) was created as a separate company to oversee racing. On September 1, 1982, RSC became HRC, and ran Honda's road racing, endurance, trials and motocross racing programs.

Research and development

User support
HRC has HRC Service Shops at 23 locations in Japan and seven sites overseas.

Ownership
HRC is a wholly owned subsidiary of Honda.

HRC team
HRC has a racing team that competes in World Superbikes, which is called Team HRC.

World Superbike

Team HRC is the official factory team of the Honda Racing Corporation in the Superbike class of WorldSBK (World Championship road racing).

By season results
(key) (Races in bold indicate pole position; races in italics indicate fastest lap)

* Season still in progress.

See also

References

Honda motorcycles
Motorcycle racing teams
Official motorsports and performance division of automakers
Aalst, Belgium
Honda in motorsport
Motorcycle racing teams established in 1982
1982 establishments in Japan